The Ottawa Jr. Senators are a junior-age men's ice hockey team from Ottawa, Ontario, Canada. Their home arena is the Jim Durrell Recreation Centre in south Ottawa. The club is in the Robinson Division of the Central Canada Hockey League, a Junior "A" league. The team is not affiliated with the NHL Ottawa Senators.

History
The Senators joined the Central Junior A Hockey League in 1979. In 1992, the Ottawa Senators changed their name to the Ottawa Jr. Senators because of the NHL team Ottawa Senators. Ottawa won their first Art Bogart Cup in 1983 over Pembroke. Ten years later, they won their second championship. In 1995, Ottawa came close against the Cornwall Colts for their third championship. The 2000-01 season was memorable for the Ottawa Jr. Senators as they achieved the lowest goals allowed in the league (173) and finished 2nd, despite being 10 points behind the Cornwall Colts, as both teams met in the championship finals. The series went to 7 games, but the Jr. Senators lost in a humiliating 7-0 loss.

The following year, the Jr. Senators were determined to repeat their previous season, and settled for 3rd overall behind Cornwall and Nepean. Ottawa managed to defeat Nepean in 6 games and return to the final. This time, Ottawa won the series in 5 games and qualified for the Fred Page Cup in Truro. The semi-final game against the Valleyfield Braves and Ottawa Jr. Senators meant the winner would go to the Royal Bank Cup in Halifax, as the hosts Halifax Oland Exports already earned a bye to the final. Ottawa punched their ticket to the Royal Bank Cup winning 7-2 over the Braves. Ottawa lost the Fred Page Cup championship game 4-2 to Halifax.

At the Royal Bank Cup, the Jr. Senators ended up finishing 4th with a 1-3 record. Ottawa faced Halifax for the fourth time, and the semi-final was a back and forth scoring game, but Halifax ended up taking the game 9-7 and eventually capturing the Royal Bank Cup.

The championship team was lost in a blockbuster trade with the Gloucester Rangers, who were rebuilding their team and overcoming a dead-last finish in the 2001-02 standings. Despite only carrying three returnees, the Jr. Senators still managed to upset the top 2 teams in the league en route to the Art Bogart Cup against Nepean. Ottawa couldn't handle the Nepean Raiders and lost the series in 5 games.

The Ottawa Jr. Senators wouldn't return to the semi-finals until 2009. Ottawa lost the previous three game 7 semi-final games. The most-heartbreaking loss was in 2015, when the Pembroke Lumber Kings scored the game winner with just under a minute left in the game.

For the 2012-13 season, the Ottawa Jr. Senators changed their colors back to blue, red, and white and returned to their old logo that they last used in 1995.

In fall 2016, the Ottawa Jr. Senators won the right to host the Fred Page Cup in 2018. Ottawa was slated to host the 2003 tournament, but pulled out and hosting duties were awarded to Cornwall.

After appearing in the championship final for two consecutive years, but falling to the Carleton Place Canadians, the 2017-18 Junior Senators were finally able to conquer their arch nemesis who were once again favored to win it all. Ottawa surprised the hockey observers by knocking out Carleton Place in five games. They then followed the act by claiming their first ever Fred Page Cup which earned them a trip to the Royal Bank Cup in Chilliwack, British Columbia where they lost in the semi-finals to the host Chiefs.

In the 2018-19 season, Ottawa faced Carleton Place in the finals for the fourth consecutive season. The Junior Senators took it to the favoured Canadians and claim the championship series in five games. They once again claim the Fred Page Cup before flying to Brooks, Alberta for the National Junior A Championships where they lost to the host Brooks Bandits 4-3 in the semi-finals. Goaltender Francis Boisvert took home the tournaments MVP.

Season-by-season record
Note: GP = Games Played, W = Wins, L = Losses, T = Ties, OTL = Overtime Losses, GF = Goals for, GA = Goals against

Fred Page Cup 
Eastern Canada Championships
MHL - QAAAJHL - CCHL - Host
Round robin play with 2nd vs 3rd in semi-final to advance against 1st in the finals.

Royal Bank Cup
Canadian Jr. A National ChampionshipsDudley Hewitt Champions – Central, Fred Page Champions – Eastern, Doyle Cup Champion – Pacific, ANAVET Cup Champion – Western, and HostRound-robin play with top four in semifinal games and winners to finals.

Championships
CJHL Bogart Cup Championships: 1983, 1993, 2002, 2018, 2019
Eastern Canadian Fred Page Cup Championships: 2000, 2018, 2019
CJAHL Royal Bank Cup Championships: None

Notable alumni
Peter Ambroziak
David Appleby
Eric Beaudoin
Brendan Bell
Alain Chevrier
Dean De Fazio
Ben Eager
Dave Ellett
Garry Galley
Steve Graves
Tim Higgins
Alan Kuntz
Marc Lamothe
Guy Larose
Peter Lee
Charlie Luksa
Justin Papineau
Larry Regan
Jamie Rivers
Shawn Rivers
Randy Robitaille
Derek Smith
Chris Therien
Wayne Thomas

External links
Ottawa Jr. Senators Webpage

 

Central Canada Hockey League teams
Ju
Ice hockey clubs established in 1979
1979 establishments in Ontario